Jung Hee-tae (Korean: 정희태, Jeonghuitae, born 5 July 1974) is a South Korean actor. He is known for his roles in My Mind's Flower Rain (2016), My Father Is Strange (2017) and  2018 drama series Radio Romance. He has appeared in about 75 TV series, theatrical plays and films including 2021 film Sweet & Sour. In 2021, he also appeared in TV series Navillera and is appearing in Artificial City.

Career
Jung debuted as an actor in 2002 with the film The Coast Guard.

In August 2019, Jung was appointed as public relations ambassador for  Nam-gu by the mayor. His short film Outing with Lee Seung-yeon won the Jury Grand Prize at the Spanish Short Film Festival.

In November 2021, Jung Hee-tae along with Jung Da-eun were appointed as ambassadors for sharing 'Warm Day' sanitary napkin support campaign by NGO under Ministry of Foreign Affairs and Trade.

Filmography

Films

Television series

Theater

Awards and nominations

References

External links
 Official website
 
 Jung Hee-tae on KMDb
 Jung Hee-tae on Daum 

21st-century South Korean male actors
South Korean male television actors
South Korean male film actors 
Living people
People from Ulsan
1974 births
Chung-Ang University alumni